Atu may refer to:
 Atu, a character in Samoan mythology
 Atu Bosenavulagi, an Australian rules footballer
 Atu, Iran, a village in Iran
 Atu Moli, New Zealand rugby union player
 Atu'u is a village on Tutuila Island, American Samoa

ATU may refer to:

Organizations
 African Telecommunications Union
 Allameh Tabataba'i University
 Amalgamated Transit Union
 Arkansas Tech University
 Atlantic Technological University
 ATU Network was a caucus group within the Amicus trade union
 Anti-Terrorist Unit (Liberia)
 Lučko Anti-Terrorist Unit
 Asian Taekwondo Union, the official governing body for Taekwondo in Asia

Other uses
 Aarne–Thompson–Uther classification, a catalogue of folktale types
 Abstract Tribe Unique, rap musicians using #ATU hashtag
 Accumulated thermal unit
 Address translation unit
 Antenna tuning unit
 Finnish Rapid Deployment Force#Amphibious Task Unit
 Antenatal testing unit
 Assessment and treatment unit
 Autonomous territorial unit, a type of administrative division in Moldova